Patrick F. Fottrell was President of the University of Galway between 1996 and 2000. He was appointed Chair of Biochemistry in December 1976. A lecture theatre in the Arts Millennium Building on the university campus is named after him. He became Chairperson of Science Foundation Ireland (SFI) in 2003.

References

People educated at North Monastery
Presidents of the University of Galway
Year of birth missing (living people)
Living people
Science Foundation Ireland